Alee is a term to meaning "away from the wind".

Alee may also refer to:
 Alee (singer), a Canadian country music singer-songwriter
 Alee Murtuza, a Bangladeshi academic

See also 
 Allee, a given name and surname